Te'un may be,

Te'un Island
Te'un language